Stichopogon is a genus of small robber flies of the subfamily Dasypogoninae. There are at least 100 described species in Stichopogon.

See also
 List of Stichopogon species

References

Asilidae genera